Ty Bodden (born December 15, 1993) is an American Republican politician.  He is a member of the Wisconsin State Assembly, representing Wisconsin's 59th Assembly district since January 2023.  He is the chairman of the Republican Party of Calumet County, Wisconsin, and previously served on the Stockbridge, Wisconsin, village board.

Biography

He graduated from Stockbridge High School, in Stockbridge, Wisconsin, in 2012 and went on to University of Wisconsin–Green Bay, where he earned his bachelor's degree in political science and public administration in 2016.  He then completed his master's in public administration from Arkansas State University.

During college, he worked as a ranch hand at Cristo Rey Ranch, which provides animal therapy for children and the elderly with intellectual disabilities.  He subsequently became a manager of the ranch, and is now chair of the ranch's nonprofit board.  From 2019 through 2022, he worked as administrative staff at two Wisconsin Department of Corrections facilities, Kettle Moraine Correctional Institution and Taycheedah Correctional Institution.

Bodden now works as a Legislative Researcher for The New American, a publication of the John Birch Society, since Spring 2022. He has resided in St. Cloud, Wisconsin, Theresa, Wisconsin, Fond du Lac, Wisconsin, and Kewaskum, Wisconsin.

Political career
Bodden has been involved with the Republican Party of Wisconsin since college, and worked as campaign manager for Jesse Kremer during his first run for Wisconsin State Assembly in 2014.  From that campaign, he went directly onto Duey Stroebel's campaign in his special election for Wisconsin Senate in Spring 2015.  That summer, he received an internship in the Wisconsin Legislature, and followed that up with internships in the office of the mayor of Green Bay, Wisconsin—which was then Republican Jim Schmitt—through the Spring of 2016.  He then worked for the Assembly campaign of Ron Tusler.  In the Fall of 2017, he was appointed to the village board of Stockbridge, Wisconsin, and was subsequently elected to two full terms, leaving office in May 2022.

In January 2018, state representative Jesse Kremer announced he would not run for re-election to a third term in the Assembly.  Bodden entered the race for the Republican nomination to succeed Kremer in the 59th Assembly district, and he received Kremer's endorsement, as his former campaign manager.  Depite Kremer's endorsement, however, Bodden fell 295 votes short of Timothy Ramthun in the four-candidate Republican primary, and Ramthun went on to win the general election in the heavily Republican district.

Ramthun ultimately served two terms before choosing to run in the Republican primary for Governor of Wisconsin in 2022.  He was therefore unable to run for another term in the Assembly, and Bodden announced another attempt for the 59th Assembly district seat in April 2022.  He faced Kewaskum tavern owner Vinny Egle in the Republican primary and prevailed decisively with 64% of the vote.  He was unopposed in the general election.  While running for Assembly in the Fall of 2022, he was also employed as an organizer for U.S. senator Ron Johnson's re-election campaign.

He took office in January 2023.

Personal life and family
Bodden is married to his high school sweetheart, Paige Mueller, and resides in the village of Stockbridge.  They have two living children. His 3rd-great grandfather, Jacob Bodden, an immigrant from Germany, served three terms as a Democratic member of the Assembly, and was a sheriff of Dodge County, Wisconsin.

Electoral history

Wisconsin Assembly (2018)

| colspan="6" style="text-align:center;background-color: #e9e9e9;"| Republican Primary, August 14, 2018

Wisconsin Assembly (2022)

| colspan="6" style="text-align:center;background-color: #e9e9e9;"| Republican Primary, August 9, 2022

| colspan="6" style="text-align:center;background-color: #e9e9e9;"| General Election, November 8, 2022

References

External links
 Campaign website
 
 Ty Bodden at Wisconsin Vote

1994 births
Living people
Republican Party members of the Wisconsin State Assembly 
People from Stockbridge, Wisconsin
21st-century American politicians
University of Wisconsin–Green Bay alumni
Arkansas State University alumni